B68 Toftir is a Faroese football club, playing in the village of Toftir in Betri deildin.

History
After being promoted to the 1. deild (now called Effodeildin) in 1980, they won the league 3 times: in 1984, 1985, and 1992. In 2004 they were relegated. 2005 saw them bounce back to the top flight, coming first in the second division, but they were again relegated from the Premier Division at end of the 2006 season. In 2007, they easily won the second division, and were promoted.

In the 2008 season, they came 6th out of 10 in the Premier League. In the 2009 season, they finished in 4th place. In 2010, they finished as number 7 in the Effodeildin, and in 2011, they finished as number 6.

In 2012, B68 Toftir ended as number 9 in Effodeildin and were relegated: they only needed to score one more goal against TB Tvøroyri in the final round to stay up. They won the match 4–1, but it was not enough. They played in 1. deild in 2013.

Achievements

Faroe Islands Premier League: 3
 1984, 1985, 1992
1. deild: 4
 1980, 2005, 2007, 2013
FSF Trophy: 1
 2005

B68 Toftir in Europe

UEFA club competition record

Staff
Manager:  Páll Guðlaugsson
Ass. manager:  Jóhan Petur Poulsen
Ass. manager:  Hans Erik Danielsen
Caretaker:  Jógvan Hendrik Johannessen
Caretaker:  Trúgvi Súnason í Hjøllum

Former players

  Ibrahima Camara

Chairmen
 Betuel Hansen (1962–?)
 Johan Hammer
 Dánjal Eli Højgaard
 Johan Hammer
 Dánjal Eli Højgaard
 Johan Hammer
 Marius Danielsen
 Jóannes á Líðarenda
 Janus Jensen (1978–79)
 Haldur Gaardbo (1979–82)
 Niclas Davidsen (1982–07)
 Jógvan Højgaard (2007–13)
 Beinta Mikkelsen (2013–14)
 Niclas Davidsen (2014–)

Managers

 Baldvin Baldvinsson (1978–79)
 Bent Løfquist (1980–81)
 Sólbjørn Mortensen (1981–82)
 Valter Jensen (1983)
 John Kramer (1984–86)
 Svend Aage Strandholm (1987)
 John Kramer (1988–89)
 Kenneth Rosén (Jan 1990 – June 90)
 Finnur Helmsdal (July 1990 – Dec 90)
 Jan Kaczynski (1991)
 Jógvan Nordbúð (1992–93)
 Petur Mohr (1994–95)
 Christian Tranbjerg (Jan 1996 – July 96)
 Jógvan Martin Olsen (Aug 1996 – Dec 96)
 Mihajlo Djuran (1997)
 Petur Simonsen (1998)
 Bjørn Christensen (1999)
 Jóannes Jakobsen (2000–01)
 Frank Skytte (Jan 2002 – Sept 02)
 Ingolf Petersen (Sept 2002 – Dec 02)
 Petur Mohr (2003–04)
 Trygvi Mortensen (2004)
 Julian Johnsson (2005)
 Jóannes Jakobsen (Jan 2006 – July 2006)
 Julian Johnsson (July 2006)
 Bill McLeod Jacobsen (Aug 2006 – Dec 2006)
 Rúni Nolsøe (2007)
 Bill McLeod Jacobsen (Jan 2008 – Dec 11)
 Pauli Poulsen (Jan 2012 – Sept 12)
 Bill McLeod Jacobsen (Sept 2012 – Oct 12)
 Øssur Hansen (Okt 2012–14)
 Súni Fríði Barbá (2014–15)
 Páll Guðlaugsson (Oct 2015–)

See also

B68 Toftir II

References

 Portal.fo, Keita og Ndende halda fram í B68 (Faroese)
 FaroeSoccer.com
 footballzz.co.uk

External links
 Official website
 Svangaskarð - Nordic Stadiums
 Islands Soccer news, transfer, fixtures, league table, etc...

 
Association football clubs established in 1962
1962 establishments in the Faroe Islands